The 2013 Zimbabwe Premier Soccer League season (known as the Castle Larger Premier Soccer League for sponsorship reasons) will be the thirty third season of the Zimbabwe Premier Soccer League since its establishment in 1980. The season began on 28 March 2013.

Dynamos are the defending champions, having won the previous 2012 Zimbabwe Premier Soccer League season. The season will feature 12 teams from the 2012 ZPSL season and four new teams promoted from the 2012 Zifa Division One League: How Mine, Triangle United F.C., Triple B and Black Rhinos who replace relegated Buffaloes F.C., Harare City, Hardbody and Quelaton.

Teams
A total of 16 teams will contest the league, including 12 sides from the 2012 season and four promoted from the 2012 Zifa Division One League.

Stadiums and locations
Football teams in Zimbabwe tend to use multiple stadiums over the course of a season for their home games. The following table will only indicate the stadium used most often by the club for their home games

League table

References

External links
Zimbabwe Premier Soccer League
SoccerWay
ZPSL Results
ZPSL Standings

2013 in Zimbabwean sport
Zim